Lola Petticrew (born 26 December 1995) is an Irish actor. They starred in the films A Bump Along the Way (2019) and Dating Amber (2020). On television, they are known for their roles in Bloodlands (2021–) and Three Families (2021) on BBC One.

Early life
Petticrew is from West Belfast and grew up on a council estate, the eldest sibling to two sisters and a brother. Both their parents are healthcare workers. They attended St Dominic's Grammar School for Girls. They joined a local drama group when they were 12. They went on to train at the Royal Welsh College of Music & Drama, graduating in 2017 with a Bachelor of Arts in Acting.

Career
Petticrew made their feature film debut as Allegra in the 2019 comedy-drama film A Bump Along the Way, which earned them a New Talent Award at the Galway Film Fleadh. They had more film roles in 2020, starring as the titular character in Dating Amber opposite Fionn O'Shea, and playing Jessica and Alex in Here Are the Young Men and Shadows respectively. In addition, they appeared as Lucy in the BBC Three miniseries My Left Nut.

As of February 2021, Petticrew stars as Izzy Brannick in the BBC One police procedural Bloodlands. Originally a limited series, it was renewed in March. That May, they played Orla Healy in the two-part drama Three Families, also on BBC One, followed by Jane Seymour in the three-parter Anne Boleyn on Channel 5 in June. They also appeared in Wolf and Tuesday.

Personal life
Petticrew is queer, non-binary, and goes by they/them pronouns.

Filmography

Film

Television

Stage

Awards and nominations

Notes

References

External links

Living people
1995 births
21st-century actors from Northern Ireland
Actors from Belfast
Alumni of the Royal Welsh College of Music & Drama
LGBT actors from Northern Ireland
Non-binary actors
British non-binary actors
Queer actors